Milis is a comune in the Province of Oristano in Sardinia, Italy.

Milis may also refer to:

San Vero Milis, another comune in the Province of Oristano in Sardinia, Italy

People with the surname
Johannes Milis, from Verona, doctor of the laws and advocate, probably at Rome, who wrote a legal repertorium, c. 1430 – 1440